The following is the final results of the 2004 Asian Wrestling Championships.

Medal table

Team ranking

Medal summary

Men's freestyle

Men's Greco-Roman

Women's freestyle

Participating nations

Men's freestyle
64 competitors from 14 nations competed.

 (6)
 (3)
 (6)
 (7)
 (4)
 (6)
 (5)
 (2)
 (2)
 (6)
 (2)
 (7)
 (2)
 (6)

Men's Greco-Roman
53 competitors from 11 nations competed.

 (2)
 (5)
 (7)
 (2)
 (5)
 (7)
 (6)
 (2)
 (7)
 (7)
 (3)

Women's freestyle
54 competitors from 11 nations competed.

 (5)
 (4)
 (7)
 (7)
 (3)
 (2)
 (7)
 (7)
 (5)
 (4)
 (3)

References
UWW Database

Asia
W
W
W
Asian Wrestling Championships
W
W
International wrestling competitions hosted by Iran